Clifton is a civil parish in the Eden District, Cumbria, England. It contains 15 buildings that are recorded in the National Heritage List for England. Of these, one is listed at Grade II*, the middle of the three grades, and the others are at Grade II, the lowest grade.  The parish contains the village of Clifton, and is otherwise rural.  Most of the listed buildings are houses, farmhouses, and farm buildings.  The other listed buildings include a church, a cross in the churchyard, a boundary stone, and a pottery.


Key

Buildings

Notes and references

Notes

Citations

Sources

Lists of listed buildings in Cumbria